Joseph Moyle Caddy (1885 – 8 April 1946) was an English professional footballer who played for Plymouth Argyle in the Southern Football League as an outside-left.

Personal life
Caddy served as a corporal in the Devonshire Regiment and the Worcestershire Regiment during the First World War. He suffered a gunshot wound to the head in May 1918.

Career statistics

References

1885 births
1946 deaths
People from Wendron
Association football forwards
English footballers
Southern Football League players
Plymouth Argyle F.C. players
British Army personnel of World War I
Devonshire Regiment soldiers
Military personnel from Cornwall
Worcestershire Regiment soldiers
British shooting survivors